Boyagin Rock is located  south west of Brookton and  north west of Pingelly in the Wheatbelt region of Western Australia, which is approximately  south east of Perth.

The Boyagin Nature Reserve contains Boyagin Rock, and is widely recognised as one of the few areas of intact original fauna and flora in the Avon Wheatbelt bioregion. It provides refuge for a variety of fauna including numbats, goannas, echidnas and Tammar wallabies. The reserve was established in 1978, and covers an area of 1.21 km2.

Aboriginal significance

Boyagin Rock is known to the Noongar as "Boogin" and according to the Balardong Noongar it is a site of significance. A traditional story of how the rock came to be is from Noongar Elder Janet Collard who said that her husband (Andy Collard) told the story of how a big Wagyl (dreamtime water snake) wound itself round and round  to form the rock, and is the last resting place of the Wagyl. Elder Cliff Humphries also spoke of the Wagyl who would during the time of creation travel from places including Boyagin Rock.

Len Collard, through his research with elders of the area, was told calling out the name of the Wagyl at this location will bring the rains. Another belief is that if you walk to the top of the outcrop without stopping you will have a long life.

See also
Granite outcrops of Western Australia

References

External link

 Boyagin Nature Reserve, Parks and Wildlife Service, Government of Western Australia

Wheatbelt (Western Australia)
Rock formations of Western Australia
Noongar placenames
Places of Noongar significance
Nature reserves in Western Australia
Avon Wheatbelt
Inselbergs of Western Australia